Barmulloch is a district in the Scottish city of Glasgow. It is situated north of the River Clyde. Formerly rural, it was developed as a post war overspill housing area, largely featuring Prefabricated housing. Barmulloch shared the Red Road complex of multi-storey flats with the neighbouring district of Balornock prior to their demolition. Barmulloch has recently undergone huge changes which included demolition of tenement housing and building of new houses with driveways and private gardens. These developments are followed closely by Scottish charity Barmulloch Community Development Company (BCDC) who own 3 community premises in Barmulloch - Barmulloch Residents Centre in Quarrywood Road, the Recreation Hall in Quarrywood Avenue and the Broomfield Road Centre in Broomfield Road.

Areas of Glasgow
Housing estates in Glasgow
Springburn